The Fat Cat Sat on the Mat is a 1996 children's book by Nurit Karlin. Published by HarperCollins as part of the reading readiness program, the book stresses the ability to read words of specific structure, such as -at. The plot regards a large cat that refuses to get off a mat, despite bribery attempts from a furious rat.

References

1996 children's books
American children's books
Learning to read
Books about cats
American picture books